Emma Alegre (born 1933) is a retired Filipina actress, who worked from 1954 to 1957, mostly for LVN Pictures. She first appeared in Dalaginding. Her third movie was Damong Ligaw, where she was billed second (behind Tessie Quintana). In her fourth movie, Dambanang Putik, she played the friend of Delia Razon.

Filmography
 Dalaginding (1954)
 Tin-Edyer (a.k.a. Teenager) (1954)
 Damong Ligaw (1954)
 Dambanang Putik (a.k.a. Muddy Altar) (1954)
 Hiram na Kasintahan (a.k.a. Borrowed Lover) (1954)
 Tagapagmana (a.k.a. Inheritance) (1955)
 Palasyong Pawid (a.k.a. Wood Palace) (1955)
 Higit sa Lahat (a.k.a. Most of All) (1955)
 1 2 3 (1955)
 Pasikat (1955)
 Karnabal (a.k.a. Carnival) (1955)
 Pilipino Kostum No Touch (a.k.a. Filipino Custom No Touch) (1955)
 Chaperon (1956)
 Everlasting (1956)
 Idolo (a.k.a. Idol) (1956)
 Medalyong Perlas (a.k.a. Pearl Medal) (1956)
 Dalawang Ina (a.k.a. Two Mothers) (1957)
 Hukom Roldan (a.k.a. Judge Roldan) (1957)
 Basta Ikaw (a.k.a. If it's You, OK) (1957)
 Tingnan Natin (a.k.a. Let me See) (1957)

References

External links
 Comfort cafe

1933 births
Living people
Filipino film actresses
Date of birth missing (living people)
Place of birth missing (living people)